Kang Chol-gu is  a politician of the Democratic People's Republic of Korea (North Korea). He is also a candidate member of the Central Committee of the Workers' Party of Korea as well as Minister of Shipbuilding Industry in the Cabinet of North Korea.

Biography
In 2019, he was appointed to head the Ministry of Shipping and Industry in the Cabinet of North Korea headed by Premier, Kim Jae-ryong. In April 2019, it was elected as a candidate for the Central Committee of the Workers 'Party of Korea at the 4th Plenum of the 7th Party of the Workers' Party. In March 2019, he was elected to the 14th convocation of the Supreme People's Assembly representing district 521.

References

Government ministers of North Korea
Members of the Supreme People's Assembly
Living people
Year of birth missing (living people)
Alternate members of the 8th Central Committee of the Workers' Party of Korea